Starrcade '95: World Cup of Wrestling was the 13th annual Starrcade professional wrestling pay-per-view (PPV) event produced by World Championship Wrestling (WCW). It took place on December 27, 1995, at the Nashville Municipal Auditorium in Nashville, Tennessee. The event included a seven match tournament between wrestlers representing WCW and their Japanese partner New Japan Pro-Wrestling (NJPW) billed as the "World Cup of Wrestling", in which Sting (WCW) defeated Kensuke Sasaki (NJPW) in the finals; WCW won the tournament four points to three. Ric Flair defeated Randy Savage in the main event for the WCW World Heavyweight Championship.

WCW closed in 2001 and all rights to their television and pay-per-view shows were bought by WWE, including the Starrcade series.
In 2015, All WCW pay-per-views were made available on the WWE Network.

Production

Background
From the 1960s to the 1980s, it was tradition for Jim Crockett Promotions (JCP), a member of the National Wrestling Alliance (NWA), to hold major professional wrestling events at Thanksgiving and Christmas, often at the Greensboro Coliseum in Greensboro, North Carolina in the center of JCP's Virginia, North and South Carolina territory. In 1983, JCP created Starrcade as their supercard to continue the Thanksgiving tradition, bringing in wrestlers from other NWA affiliates and broadcasting the show in its territory on closed-circuit television. Starrcade soon became the flagship event of the year for JCP and highlighted their most important feuds and championship matches. In 1987 the show became available by nationwide pay-per-view as were all subsequent Starrcade shows. The Starrcade tradition was continued by World Championship Wrestling (WCW), into which JCP was transformed after it had been sold to Ted Turner in 1988. The 1995 event was the thirteenth show to use the Starrcade name and was the second Starrcade to take place in the Nashville Municipal Auditorium in Nashville, Tennessee.

Storylines
The event featured wrestlers from pre-existing scripted feuds and storylines. Wrestlers portrayed villains, heroes, or less distinguishable characters in the scripted events that built tension and culminated in a wrestling match or series of matches.

Event

WCW won the "World Cup of Wrestling", four points to three as Sting defeated New Japan Pro-Wrestling (NJPW) representative Kensuke Sasaki in the seventh and final match of the tournament.

At the event Ric Flair also defeated Lex Luger and Sting by count-out in a Triangle match to earn an immediate title match against WCW World Heavyweight Champion Randy Savage in the main event. Flair defeated Savage for the championship.

After the main event WCW held one additional match, taping it for a later broadcast. The match saw WCW United States Champion Kensuke Sasaki wrestle against The One Man Gang. At the end of the match the 400-plus pound One Man Gang landed a splash on Sasaki and covered him for the pinfall. While Sasaki kicked out of the pinfall, referee Randy Eller still made the three-count to give victory to the One Man Gang. After the bell rang the One Man Gang celebrated with the title belt. Moments later however, the mistake was pointed out by another official, and the match was restarted. Sasaki then pinned Gang to retain the title. Parts of the match were later shown on WCW Saturday Night but they ended after One Man Gang was declared the new champion. WCW never acknowledged that the match was restarted, choosing to recognize the One Man Gang as champion instead.

Reception
Lance Augustine of TJRWrestling gave the event a rating of 6.75/10, stating, "I thought this was a really well put together show that showcased a lot of WCW talent at the time. The Benoit and Guerrero matches were top-notch and it was cool to see them beginning their ascent through the business. Most of the other tournament matches were solid as well with Luger, Savage, Sting, and Flair being super over on the night and really had their moments where the crowd was into all of them. The Triangle Match could have been way shorter and while I didn’t like taking the title off Savage so quickly, losing it to Flair isn’t a bad thing. Hogan being off the show was a bit odd too, but he was kayfabe suspended because he was probably shooting a movie or something. I thought the show was a definite step up from the last couple of outings, and it will be fun to dive into the next year."

Results

References

Starrcade
1995 in Tennessee
Professional wrestling in Nashville, Tennessee
Events in Nashville, Tennessee
December 1995 events in the United States
1995 World Championship Wrestling pay-per-view events